Sherekino is a rural locality (a settlement at the railway station) in Kudintsevky Selsoviet Rural Settlement, Lgovsky District, Kursk Oblast, Russia. Population:

Geography 
The settlement is located on the Seym River, 52 km from the Russia–Ukraine border, 65.5 km west of Kursk, 3.5 km north of the district center – the town Lgov, 5 km from the selsoviet center – Kudintsevo.

 Climate
Sherekino has a warm-summer humid continental climate (Dfb in the Köppen climate classification).

Transport 
Sherekino is located 6 km from the road of regional importance  (Kursk – Lgov – Rylsk – border with Ukraine), 2 km from the road  (38K-017 – Lgov), on the road of intermunicipal significance  (Lgov – Kudintsevo), next to the railway station Sherekino (railway line Navlya – Lgov-Kiyevsky).

The rural locality is situated 72 km from Kursk Vostochny Airport, 148 km from Belgorod International Airport and 275 km from Voronezh Peter the Great Airport.

References

Notes

Sources

Rural localities in Lgovsky District